Ahmed Fathy Mehalba was a United States Department of Defense civilian translator/ interrogator  who was accused of lying to government agents and removing classified documents from the Guantanamo Bay detention facility.

Childhood and emigration to United States
Born in Egypt, Mehalba emigrated to the United States and became a naturalized citizen.
Mehalba received a medical discharge from the Army in May 2001 and was later hired a San Diego defense contractor, Titan Corporation,  to be an Arabic-English translator at Guantanamo Bay.

Arrest and conviction
In 2003, Mehalba was assigned as a civilian interpreter/ interrogator at Guantanamo. He was arrested on September 29, 2003, at Boston Logan Airport. Mehalba had flown into Logan  through Italy from Cairo, Egypt.  On a routine admission through U.S. customs, Mehalba presented a U.S. passport and a US military identification card. When asked about some computer CDs, he said that they contained only music and videos he had made while in Egypt. One CD was labeled secret. Mehalba told inspectors that he did not have any official U.S. government documents.

In January 2005, Mehalba pleaded guilty to lying to governments agents and removing classified documents. Mehalba was sentenced to 20 months in prison, with credit for 17 months, time served. He was released in March, 2005.

References

External links
Finer, Jonathan   Interpreter Pleads Guilty to Taking Data Washington Post, (January 11, 2005)
 CNN  Court-martial begins for ex-Gitmo interpreter 
Former Civilian Translator Sentenced to 20 Months Rantburg (February 18, 2005)

1973 births
Living people
Egyptian emigrants to the United States
People with acquired American citizenship
American spies